Lyrosoma is a genus of primitive carrion beetles in the family Agyrtidae. There are at least three described species in Lyrosoma.

Species
These three species belong to the genus Lyrosoma:
 Lyrosoma chujoi Mroczkowski, 1959
 Lyrosoma opacum Mannerheim, 1853
 Lyrosoma pallidum Eschscholtz

References

Further reading

External links

 

Staphylinoidea
Articles created by Qbugbot